This is a list of presidents of Deportivo de La Coruña, a Spanish professional football club based in the city of A Coruña, Galicia.

As of Feb 8, 2021.

References 

Presidents